Eric Roy Peck (1 August 1899 – 18 July 1948) was an Australian rules footballer who played with Geelong, Melbourne and St Kilda in the Victorian Football League (VFL).

Notes

External links 

1899 births
1948 deaths
Australian rules footballers from Victoria (Australia)
Geelong Football Club players
Melbourne Football Club players
St Kilda Football Club players